Masnick is a surname. Notable people with the surname include:

 Mike Masnick, founder of the Techdirt website
 Paul Masnick (born 1931), Canadian ice hockey forward